Soyaux ( or ) is a commune in the Charente department in the Nouvelle-Aquitaine region in southwestern France.

Population

Notable people
 
 
Bruno Périer (born 1966), former professional footballer

Sights
 Sentier botanique de Soyaux

See also
Communes of the Charente department
ASJ Soyaux

Twin town 
Soyaux is twinned with Monifieth, Angus, Scotland since 1994.

References

Communes of Charente